Howard Jeffrey Gottesfeld (born 1956) is an American novelist, playwright, and screen and television writer. In recent years he has focused on writing texts for picture books for children, grades two and up.

Biography 
Gottesfeld grew up in Teaneck, New Jersey, attended Teaneck High School, Colby College, and then the University of San Francisco School of Law.

Gottesfeld has written freelance for numerous magazines and newspapers, and continues to publish essays on such subjects as the ongoing controversy over the Confederate flag, immigration policy, and trends in young adult fiction. Among his favorite authors are Carson McCullers, Flannery O'Connor, Herman Wouk, and George Orwell.

His fiction ranges from elementary age children to adult. For television, he has written for such shows as Smallville and The Young and the Restless. Songs for which he wrote the lyrics have been recorded by such country artists as Mitchell John. Together with Cherie Bennett, he has written under the pen name Zoey Dean. His first picture book is The Tree in the Courtyard, published by Random House/Knopf in March, 2016. It received starred reviews in Booklist and School Library Journal. His 2020 children's book, No Steps Behind, documents the life and activism of Beate Sirota Gordon. It is the winner of the 2020 NCTA Freeman Award, for the best children's book about Asia. It was also a runner-up finalist for the 2020 National Jewish Book Award. His March, 2021 picture book, with illustrations by Matt Tavares, is Twenty-One Steps, published by Candlewick Press. By early February 2021, it had garnered a number of starred reviews, as well as praise from the Wall Street Journal. It is about the origins of the Tomb of the Unknown Soldier and the Tomb Guards who stand sentinel there, every moment of every day.

Television credits

Broken Bridges (2006)

The Young and the Restless (hired by Lynn Marie Latham)
Script Writer: December 14, 2006 - December 21, 2007; March 18 - August 19, 2008
Associate Head Writer: July 2007 - December 21, 2007; March 18 - July 10, 2008

As the World Turns
 Breakdown Writer: 2005

Port Charles
 Story Consultant: 1998

Another World
 Story Consultant: 1997

Girls Got Game: 2006

Smallville: 2001 - 2002

Films
Broken Bridges (Writer: 2006)

Books
Book Series
Dawson's Creek (seven original novels)
Mirror Image (four book series)
 Robinson's Hood (three book series)
 Campus Confessions (four book series)

Six Book Series
University Hospital
Teen Angels
Trash
 'Amen, L.A.'
 'SuperFan!'
 'SuperFan #2: Tag-Teamed!"

Other Books
A Heart Divided
Anne Frank And Me
 Turn Me On (writing as Cherie Jeffrey, with Cherie Bennett)
The Tree in the Courtyard (illustrated by Peter McCarty)
No Steps Behind (Creston, 2020), (illustrated by Shiella Witanto)
 Twenty-One Steps (Candlewick, 2021) (illustrated by Matt Tavares)

Plays 
 'A Heart Divided'
 'Anne Frank and Me" (with Cherie Bennett)
 '10 x 10' (ten short plays about values, editor)
 'Does My Head Look Big in This?' (with Elizabeth Wong)
 "The World's Strongest Librarian" (with Elizabeth Wong)

References

External links 
Official website:biography
Jeff Gottesfeld Interview: Author of new WWE book – SuperFan!

21st-century American novelists
American male novelists
Colby College alumni
American television producers
American soap opera writers
American male screenwriters
Daytime Emmy Award winners
1956 births
Living people
Soap opera producers
University of San Francisco School of Law alumni
Novelists from New Jersey
Jewish American writers
American male television writers
American male essayists
21st-century American essayists
21st-century American male writers
Screenwriters from New Jersey
Teaneck High School alumni
21st-century American screenwriters
21st-century American Jews